Julius Kasparavičius (born 3 April 1995) is a Lithuanian footballer who plays as a striker.

Career

As a youth player, Kasparavičius joined the youth academy of English Premier League side West Ham. He started his career with Šilutė in the Lithuanian second tier. In 2014, Kasparavičius signed for Lithuanian top flight club Atlantas. In 2015, he signed for Palanga in the Lithuanian second tier. Before the 2018 season, he signed for Lithuanian top flight team Sūduva, helping them win the league. Before the 2019 season, Kasparavičius signed for Narva Trans in Estonia, helping them win the 2018–19 Estonian Cup. 

Before the 2020 season, he signed for Lithuanian outfit Banga. Before the second half of 2021–22, he signed for Cherno More in the Bulgarian top flight. On 20 February 2022, Kasparavičius debuted for Cherno More during a 1–2 loss to Ludogorets, scoring his team's goal. Due to injury struggles this turned out to be his only official appearance in a Cherno More shirt and he left the team by mutual consent in May 2022.

References

External links
 
 

1995 births

Living people
A Lyga players
Association football forwards
Expatriate footballers in Bulgaria
Expatriate footballers in England
Expatriate footballers in Estonia
First Professional Football League (Bulgaria) players
FK Atlantas players
FK Banga Gargždai players
FK Nevėžis players
FK Palanga players
FK Šilutė players
I Lyga players
JK Narva Trans players
Lithuanian expatriate footballers
Lithuanian expatriate sportspeople in Bulgaria
Lithuanian expatriate sportspeople in England
Lithuanian expatriate sportspeople in Estonia
Lithuanian footballers
Meistriliiga players
PFC Cherno More Varna players
FK Sūduva Marijampolė players